Düsseldorfer Turn- und Sportverein Fortuna 1895 e.V., commonly known as Fortuna Düsseldorf, is a German football club in Düsseldorf, North Rhine-Westphalia, which competes in the 2. Bundesliga.

Founded in 1895, Fortuna entered the league in 1913 and was a fixture in the top flight from the early 1920s up to the creation of the Bundesliga in 1963. 2022–23 will be their third season in a row in the 2. Bundesliga since getting relegated from the Bundesliga in the 2019–20 season. Fortuna captured one German championship in 1933 and two German cup DFB-Pokal wins in 1979 and 1980. Their greatest feat in European competition was a Cup Winners Cup final in 1979 where they lost to Barcelona.

History

Foundation to World War II
The earliest roots of the association go back to the establishment of the gymnastics club Turnverein Flingern on 5 May 1895 in the village of Flingern, today one of the eastern quarters of Düsseldorf. Two other sides figure in the club's early history: Düsseldorfer Fußballklub Spielverein, founded in 1908, and FK Alemania 1911, which was founded in 1911 and became Fortuna 1911 the following year. In mid-1913, these two clubs merged to form Düsseldorfer Fußball-Club Fortuna 1911 which played its debut season in the Westdeutschen Spielverband in 1913–14. TV Flingern joined Fortuna to create Düsseldorfer Turn- und Sportverein Fortuna on 15 November 1919.

In the late 1920s, Fortuna won its first honours as a first tier side; it captured a district level Bezirksliga title in 1927, sent its first representative to the Germany national team in 1928 (Ernst Albrecht), and took a second Bezirksliga title in 1929. The team continued to perform well into the 1930s, winning its third and fourth district titles en route to a Western German football championship in 1931 and its greatest success, a German football championship in 1933 against Schalke 04, which was on the verge of becoming the era's dominant side in Germany. Fortuna was the first team to win the title without conceding a goal in the final rounds of the tournament. It beat Vorwärts-Rasensport Gleiwitz (9–0), Arminia Hannover (3–0), Eintracht Frankfurt (4–0) and finally Schalke 04 (3–0) en route to becoming the first national champion from the industrial Rhine-Ruhr area.

In the following season, the club began playing in Gauliga Niederrhein, 1 of 16 top-flight divisions formed in the re-organization of German football under the Third Reich. Düsseldorf dominated the division through the 1930s as five-time champions between 1936 and 1940, and made losing appearances in the national championship final in 1936 (1–2 to 1. FC Nürnberg) and the final of the Tschammerpokal, the predecessor of today's DFB-Pokal, in 1937 (1–2 against Schalke 04). The club was relegated in 1942 but made a prompt return to the top flight the following season. In 1944–45, it began play as the combined wartime side Kriegsspielgemeinschaft TSV Fortuna/SC 99 Düsseldorf with partner Düsseldorfer Sport Club 1899, but took part in only two matches as Nazi Germany fell before the advance of Allied armies.

The most notable players of that era were Paul Janes, Germany's most capped player from 1942 to 1970 (71 caps), German team captain (1939–1942) and member of the Breslau Eleven that beat Denmark 8–0 in Breslau in 1937 and went on to win 10 of 11 games played during that year; Stanislaus Kobierski, who earned 26 caps and scored Germany's first ever FIFA World Cup goal; Ernst Albrecht; and Jakob Bender.

Post War era

After World War II, Allied occupation authorities ordered the dissolution of all sports organizations in Germany. Fortuna was re-formed in 1945 and then played most of their football in the Oberliga West (I) in the years between 1947 and the creation of the Bundesliga, West Germany's professional football league, in 1963. It played as a lower-to-mid-table side but did earn three appearances in the DFB-Pokal final in – 1957, 1958 and 1962 – but was not able to take the prize, losing each of those matches to Bayern Munich, VfB Stuttgart and 1. FC Nürnberg. It was also during this era that Toni Turek, goalkeeper for West Germany's "Miracle of Bern" side at the 1954 World Cup; Erich Juskowiak (30 caps and World Cup player in 1958); and later national team coach Jupp Derwall all represented Fortuna.

1960s and 1970s
Fortuna's performance was not good enough to earn them a place among the original 16 teams chosen for the newly founded Bundesliga in 1963, but the club did manage to play its way into the premier division three years later for a cameo appearance in 1966–67. Despite a sensational 2–1 away win at recently crowned European Cup Winners' Cup winners Borussia Dortmund in its Bundesliga debut, Fortuna was immediately relegated, though only to return in 1971 for a stay that lasted 16 seasons and included two third-place league finishes (in 1972–73 and 1973–74). On 9 December 1978, Fortuna recorded a 7–1 victory against Bayern Munich, to date the highest away defeat for Bayern in its entire Bundesliga history. In addition, Fortuna continued its prosperous play in the DFB-Pokal, making another three appearances. After losing in its fifth appearance in the final in 1978 against local rivals 1. FC Köln (0–2), the club finally broke through and came away as champions in 1979, prevailing 1–0 against Hertha BSC, then repeating as champions 1980 with 2–1 victory against 1. FC Köln. During this period, the club established a record for consecutive DFB-Pokal match victories, with 18-straight between 1978 and 1981.

Fortuna is among a group of four teams which have made frequent appearances in the DFB-Pokal final only to come away empty-handed. Like 1. FC Kaiserslautern, Fortuna has just two wins against five losses. 1. FC Köln has four wins and six losses in the Cup final, while Schalke 04 has been frustrated most often, with five wins and seven losses. Four of the Düsseldorfer's losses were by a single goal and two of those were in extra time.

The club's best turn in European competition was in the 1979 European Cup Winners' Cup Final, where it finished as runners-up to Barcelona, losing 4–3 in extra time in an exciting finale at Basel. It was the first of four occasions that the Catalan club won the tournament.

Fortuna achieved its success mostly with hometown players like the famous Allofs brothers (Klaus Allofs and Thomas Allofs) or players like Gerd Zewe (440 games in the Bundesliga), Dieter Herzog, Reiner Geye, Wolfgang Seel and Rudi Bommer who joined the team as nearly unknown players and ended as internationals. Between 1960 and 1967, Peter Meyer scored 119 goals in 174 games.

1980s to the new century

Since its relegation in 1987, Fortuna has bounced back and forth between leagues, spending five more seasons in the Bundesliga in 1989–92 and 1995–97 and slipping as low as Oberliga Nordrhein (IV) in 2002–04. In 2001, the club escaped relegation to tier IV only because two other clubs were denied licenses to play in tier III for financial reasons. Fortuna had its own money problems at the time but have since managed to arrange its finances more or less back into order. Between 2001 and 2003, the club was sponsored by German punk rock band Die Toten Hosen.

Recent seasons
In 2008–09, Fortuna competed in the newly established 3. Liga, finishing second and gaining automatic promotion to the 2. Bundesliga, where it finished fourth in its comeback season, 2009–10. In this season, Fortuna was the only side unbeaten in home-matches in the three top German (nationwide) leagues.

After a promising 2009–10 season, the 2010–11 season began poorly for Fortuna. After the first six games of the season, the club was in last place, having lost every match. During these first six matches, the club managed to score only two goals – one of which was an own-goal by the other side. Despite this discouraging start, Fortuna bounced back and finished the season in seventh place. 2011–12 began very differently: after the first half of the season, Fortuna was in first place in the table with a remarkable record of 12 wins, 5 draws and 0 losses. The "Herbstmeister" title gave the team and the fans hope that this could be the year Fortuna returned to the Bundesliga. The second half of the season was more challenging, as Fortuna was unable to maintain its pace: it suffered four losses and a number of draws, slipping to third place in the final standings. Nonetheless, this was sufficient for them to qualify for the two-game relegation playoff against the third-last place team in the Bundesliga – Hertha BSC. The first game of the relegation was played on 10 May 2012 in Berlin, with Fortuna winning 2–1. Fortuna drew the deciding game which was played on 15 May in Düsseldorf. Hertha fans, however, threw firecrackers at the field and the players, and one minute before the match ended, overexcited Fortuna fans stormed the field.

The promotion to the Bundesliga represented an extraordinary personal achievement for team captain Andreas Lambertz, as he became the first player in German football history to be promoted three times with the same club, from the then fourth-tier Oberliga to the Bundesliga. For striker Sascha Rösler, it marked the fourth time in his career that he was promoted from the Second Division into the Bundesliga.

Coming with the recent promotion, the club achieved a new record in German football history, becoming the only German club that has been relegated from the Bundesliga down to a fourth-tier league (time period of downfall: 1997–2002) and promoted back to the Bundesliga afterwards (time period of uprising: 2004–2012).

Fortuna started the 2012–13 Bundesliga season strongly: after five games, it was in fifth place in the table and concerns about relegation seemed to have been put to rest. However, Fortuna's 1–0 home win over SpVgg Greuther Fürth on 16 February would prove to be the club's final victory of the season. The season concluded with Fortuna playing in Hannover 96, a match Fortuna lost 0–3. This defeat, combined with an FC Augsburg win over Greuther Fürth and a bizarre and unlikely victory by 1899 Hoffenheim over second-place Borussia Dortmund, resulted in Fortuna dropping two places. Fortuna finished 17th and were again relegated back to the 2. Bundesliga.

Fortuna's relegation was the result not only of this unlikely series of occurrences on the final day of the season, but also a poor conclusion to the year. Of its final eight matches, it did not win a single one; just one win would have secured its position for the following season's Bundesliga. This poor performance contributed to the dismissal of head coach Norbert Meier.

Relegation to the 2. Bundesliga led to a period of generally disappointing performance. Fortuna spent the years between 2013 and 2017 in the middle of the table, often battling against relegation and rarely challenging for promotion back to the Bundesliga. During these years, the club went through a series of coaching changes, with Oliver Reck, Frank Kramer, and former player Mike Buskens among others leading the club at various points. Success however remained elusive.

In March 2016, Friedhelm Funkel – a native of Neuss – took over as coach of Fortuna Düsseldorf. In his first game as coach, Funkel led the club to a 4–3 win against 1. FC Kaiserslautern, ending a month-long winless streak. Funkel's start as coach marked the beginning of a period of increased stability and success for Fortuna.

At the start of the 2017–18 season, two of Fortuna's strongest performers from the previous year, goalkeeper Michael Rensing and forward Ihlas Bebou, were both lost from the club with Rensing suffering two broken ribs and Bebou transferring to Bundesliga side Hannover 96. A further setback was that Funkel's assistant Peter Hermann asked to be released from his contract with Fortuna in order to rejoin his mentor Jupp Heynckes upon his return to FC Bayern. With these three losses, it appeared that the 2017–18 season could be difficult for Fortuna. However, the club started extremely strongly: on the fourth day of the season, Fortuna had climbed to first place in the table, with a draw and three wins. For the remainder of the year, they would not drop below third place, benefiting from particularly strong play by Rensing's replacement in goal, Raphael Wolf, newly-acquired Belgian forward Benito Raman, striker Rouwen Hennings, and midfielder Florian Neuhaus. A late-season slump saw Fortuna lose three games in succession in early April, but Fortuna won their next two matches, securing promotion to the Bundesliga. In the final game of the season, with promotion already secured, Fortuna defeated 1. FC Nürnberg 3:2 on a last-minute goal thereby securing first place and the 2. Division Championship. For coach Friedhelm Funkel, this marks the sixth time he had led a club to promotion—a German record.

Fortuna Düsseldorf's return to first-division football in 2018–19 was greeted with great enthusiasm by their supporters. The first half of the season was marked by strong but inconsistent play. Fortuna played remarkably well against top Bundesliga sides, taking a point from Leipzig and defeating Hoffenheim and first-place Borussia Dortmund. Most encouraging was an away draw against the defending champions Bayern Munich, when Fortuna came back after trailing 2–0 and 3–1, to secure a 3–3 draw in the 93rd minute, with Dodi Lukebakio scored all three of Fortuna's goals. However, Fortuna failed to play with the same consistency and decisiveness against clubs lower in the table, against whom they will battle to avoid relegation, losing to Augsburg, Nürnberg and Mainz, and only managing a draw against Stuttgart. Fortuna Düsseldorf entered the mid-winter break in 14th place in the table, concluding the first half of the season with three successive wins against Freiburg, Dortmund and Hannover. Fortuna Düsseldorf enjoyed a more consistent second half of the season, with away wins over Augsburg, Hertha Berlin and one of their best performances in recent times, a storming display in a 0–4 win at Schalke 04. A 4–1 win at home to Werder Bremen and a 3–1 victory over Borussia Mönchengladbach were highlights at home, whilst other home wins over VfB Stuttgart, Nürnberg and a final day defeat of Hannover 96 ensured a 10th place finish in the Bundesliga. This achieved Fortuna Düsseldorf's highest league finish since the 1989–90 Bundesliga season, where they finished 9th.

Sponsorship
For the 2017–18 season, online sports betting website Tipbet renewed its agreement as Premium Partners of Fortuna. The deal involves marketing campaigns to raise brand awareness, while regular promotions are organised.

Players

Current squad

Out on loan

Honours
The club's honours are as follows:

Domestic
 German championship (1): 1932–33
 Runners-up: 1935–36
 2. Bundesliga (II) (2): 1988–89, 2017–18
 Regionalliga West (II) (1): 1965–66
 Oberliga Nordrhein (III) (1): 1993–94 

Cup
 DFB-Pokal (2): 1978–79, 1979–80
 Runners-up: 1936–37, 1956–57, 1957–58, 1961–62, 1977–78

International
 European Cup Winners' Cup
 Runners-up: 1978–79
 Intertoto Cup (3): 1967, 1984, 1986
 Trophy Ciudad de Palma (1): 1989

Regional
 Western German championship (I) (1): 1930-31
 Gauliga Niederrhein/Berg-Mark (I) (10): 1926–27, 1928–29, 1930–31, 1932–33, 1935–36, 1936–37, 1937–38, 1938–39, 1939–40, 1946–47 
 Western German Cup (I-II) (4+1) : 1955–56, 1956–57, 1957–58, 1961–62, 1970–71 (II)  

Reserve team
 German amateur football championship (III) (1): 1976–77

League history

1913–1914 C-Klasse (3rd tier) – Champions: 1914
1914–1918 B-Klasse (2nd tier) – Champions: 1915, 1916, 1917, 1918
1918–1919 A-Klasse (1st tier)
1919–1920 A-Klasse (2nd tier) – Champions: 1920
1920–1921 Gauliga Berg Mark (1st tier)
1921–1922 A-Klasse (2nd tier)
1922–1933 Gauliga Berg Mark (1st tier) – Champions: 1927, 1929, 1931, 1933
1933–1942 Gauliga Niederrhein (1st tier) – Champions: 1936, 1937, 1938, 1939, 1940
1942–1943 Bezirksklasse (2nd tier) – Champions: 1943
1943–1944 Gauliga Niederrhein (1st tier)
1944–1946 no contests (WW II)
1946–1947 Bezirksliga Berg Mark (1st tier) – Champions: 1947
1947–1949 Oberliga West (1st tier)
1949–1950 2. Liga West (2nd tier)
1950–1960 Oberliga West (1st tier)
1960–1961 2. Liga West (2nd tier)
1961–1963 Oberliga West (1st tier)
1963–1966 Regionalliga West (2nd tier) – Champions: 1966
1966–1967 Bundesliga (1st tier)
1967–1971 Regionalliga West (2nd tier)
1971–1987 Bundesliga (1st tier)
1987–1989 2. Bundesliga (2nd tier) – Champions: 1989
1989–1992 Bundesliga (1st tier)
1992–1993 2. Bundesliga (2nd tier)
1993–1994 Oberliga Nordrhein (3rd tier) – Champions: 1994
1994–1995 2. Bundesliga (2nd tier)
1995–1997 Bundesliga (1st tier)
1997–1999 2. Bundesliga (2nd tier)
1999–2000 Regionalliga West/Südwest (3rd tier)
2000–2002 Regionalliga Nord (3rd tier)
2002–2004 Oberliga Nordrhein (4th tier)
2004–2008 Regionalliga Nord (3rd tier)
2008–2009 3. Liga (3rd tier)
2009–2012 2. Bundesliga (2nd tier)
2012–2013 Bundesliga (1st tier)
2013–2018 2. Bundesliga (2nd tier) – Champions: 2018
2018–2020 Bundesliga (1st tier)
2020–present 2. Bundesliga (2nd tier)

Recent seasons

Notable players

Internationals for the Germany national team
Twenty-five Fortuna players have made appearances with the national side earning 240 caps between them. With the exception of Erich Juskowiak, all players debuted as Fortuna players:

Ernst Albrecht (1928–34) 17 caps
Klaus Allofs (1978–81) 21 caps (56 caps overall)
Jakob Bender (1933–35) 9 caps
Manfred Bockenfeld (1984) 1 cap
Rudi Bommer (1984) 6 caps
Kurt Borkenhagen (1952) 1 cap
Theo Breuer (1933) 2 caps
Jupp Derwall (1954) 2 caps
Reiner Geye (1972–74) 4 caps
Hans Heibach (1938) 1 cap
Dieter Herzog (1974) 5 caps
Günter Jäger (1958) 1 cap
Paul Janes (1932–42) 71 caps

Erich Juskowiak (1953–59) 30 caps (31 caps overall)
Stanislaus Kobierski (1931–41) 26 caps
Kurt Krüger (1940) 1 cap
Matthias Mauritz (1959) 1 cap
Paul Mehl (1936) 2 caps
Hans Neuschäfer (1956) 1 cap
Wolfgang Seel (1974–77) 6 caps
Bernhard Steffen (1958–60) 2 caps
Anton Turek (1950–54) 20 caps
Willi Wigold (1932–34) 4 caps
Gerd Zewe (1978–79) 4 caps
Felix Zwolanowski (1940) 2 caps

Coaches

 Kuno Klötzer (July 1963 – June 1967)
 Otto Knefler (July 1968 – June 1970)
 Heinz Lucas (July 1970 – April 1975)
 Manfred Krafft (April 1975 – April 1976)
 Sepp Piontek (July 1975 – April 1976)
 Dietrich Weise (July 1976 – June 1978)
 Hans-Dieter Tippenhauer (July 1978 – October 1979)
 Otto Rehhagel (October 1979 – December 1980)
 Heinz Höher (December 1980 – June 1981)
 Jörg Berger (July 1981 – October 1982)
 Willibert Kremer (October 1982 – April 1985)
 Dieter Brei (April 1985 – April 1987)
 Gerd Meyer (April 1987 – June 1987)
 Aleksandar Ristić (July 1987 – December 1990)
 Josef Hickersberger (December 1990 – August 1991)
 Rolf Schafstall (August 1991 – January 1992)
 Hans-Jürgen Gede (January 1992 – March 1992)
 Horst Köppel (January 1992 – August 1992)
 Rudolf Wojtowicz (interim) (August 1992)
 Aleksandar Ristić (August 1992 – November 1996)
 Rudolf Wojtowicz (November 1996 – September 1997)
 Uli Maslo (September 1997 – April 1998)
 Enver Marić (interim) (April 1998 – June 1998)
 Klaus Allofs (July 1998 – April 1999)
 Peter Neururer (April 1999 – June 1999)
 Jürgen Gelsdorf (July 1999 – May 2000)
 Aleksandar Ristić (July 2000 – January 2001)
 Uwe Fuchs (January –April 2001)
 Tim Kamp (April 2001 – April 2002)
 Stefan Emmerling (April –June 2002)
 Slavko Petrović (July 2002 – May 2003)
 Uwe Weidemann (May –June 2003)
 Massimo Morales (July 2003 – November 2004)
 Uwe Weidemann (November 2004 – November 2007)
 Wolf Werner (interim) (November –December 2007)
 Norbert Meier (January 2008 – June 2013)
 Mike Büskens (June – November 2013)
 Oliver Reck (interim) (November and December 2013)
 Lorenz-Günther Köstner (January 2014 – June 2014)
 Oliver Reck (June 2014 – February 2015)
 Taşkın Aksoy (interim) (April 2015 – June 2015)
 Frank Kramer (July 2015 – November 2015)
 Peter Hermann (interim) (November 2015 – December 2015)
 Marco Kurz (December 2015 – March 2016)
 Friedhelm Funkel (March 2016 – January 2020)
 Uwe Rösler (January 2020 – June 2021)
 Christian Preußer (July 2021 – February 2022)
 Daniel Thioune (February 2022 – )

Stadiums
 Lichtplatz (1908–19)
 Vennhauser Straße (1919–30)
 Paul-Janes-Stadion (1930–53, 1970–72, 1975–76 (Evasive), 2002–05, 2005–07 (Evasive))
 Rheinstadion (1953–70, 1972–2002)
 LTU Arena/Esprit Arena/Merkur Spiel-Arena (since 2005)
 Lena-Arena (April–May 2011)

Records and firsts
 1928: first German team to visit Africa for friendly competition
 1960: first German team to sign an African player (Charles Gyamfi)
 1978 – 7 Dec.: Fortuna obtained a 7–1 victory against Bayern Munich, to date the worst away defeat for Bayern in its entire Bundesliga history.
 1978 – 1981: consecutive DFB-Pokal match victories (18)
 2009: Fortuna set an all-time attendance record for third level football in Germany: 50,095 visitors saw a 1–0 victory against Werder Bremen U23 that meant promotion into the 2. Bundesliga.

Rivalries and fan culture
Fortuna's fiercest rivalry is with 1. FC Köln, which stems from the geographic proximity of Düsseldorf and Cologne as well as the historic rivalry between the two cities. However, in recent seasons the clubs have rarely played in the same division making head-to-head encounters increasingly rare. The 2013–14 season marked the last time the two clubs met in competitive matches when both played in the Second Division. For the 2018–19 season, Fortuna was promoted to the 1. Bundesliga precisely as 1. FC Köln was demoted from the Bundesliga to the Second Division, again avoiding the "Rheinland Derby".

Fortuna's other historic rivals are Rot-Weiss Essen, Bayer 04 Leverkusen, and Wuppertaler SV. During the 1970s, all four clubs played in the Bundesliga. Both Essen and Wuppertal have since dropped to lower leagues. Bayer Leverkusen, on the other hand, has emerged as a powerful force in the Bundesliga. Leverkusen's financial support from the Bayer chemical conglomerate has led to many Düsseldorf fans criticizing the club as "plastic" and inauthentic, without any real tradition. During the seasons when they both played in the Second Division, Fortuna's matches against MSV Duisburg and Borussia Mönchengladbach were hotly contested and were often referred to as "Lower Rhein Derbys". Fortuna Düsseldorf and Rot-Weiss Essen have played one another 59 times and many fans still regard this as a heated rivalry, but direct matches have been rare in recent years. Fortuna also has inter-city rivalries with Düsseldorf SC99 and TuRU Düsseldorf, yet these have also lost their intensity. During the post-war years, no other club within the Düsseldorf city limits has ever played in a higher division than Fortuna.

Because of the dominance of FC Bayern München in recent decades, Fortuna also has a competitive rivalry with the Bavarians. Although Düsseldorf has not mounted a serious challenge for the Bundesliga championship since the early 1970s, matches between Fortuna and FC Bayern have been fiercely contested. In a 1975 match, Bayern led at halftime 4:2, but Fortuna came back to win 6:5. On 9 December 1978, Fortuna defeated FC Bayern 7:1, an outcome which to this day remains FC Bayern's worst-ever away loss. During the 1985–86 season, Fortuna was the only team to win both of its games against the eventual champions from Munich, winning 4:0 and 3:2. 
The band Die Toten Hosen, many of whose members are enthusiastic fans of Fortuna Düsseldorf, have celebrated the team's success against FC Bayern in their song "Bayern" which appears on their album "Immortal".
The last Bundesliga game was a draw after Munich had led 3–1. Fortuna scored two goals, 3: 3 in 10 minutes.

The club has a particular strong affiliation with English League One side Ipswich Town, with their supporters making annual visits to see them at their home ground, Portman Road, since 2003. Ipswich fans have also done the same, with some coming to cheer Dusseldorf on at the Merkur Spiel-Arena.

Fortuna Düsseldorf enjoys a strong a spirited fan base, and supporters in the "ultra" curve of the stadium are well known for their elaborate choreographed displays and enthusiastic support for their club, which occasionally includes the lighting of "Bengalos" or fireworks in the stands.

Members of the band Die Toten Hosen, including lead singer Campino, are often present at Fortuna matches at home and on the road, and when Fortuna celebrated its recent 2. Division championship in front of thousands of fans at Düsseldorf's city hall on 14 May 2018, the band appeared with them. The band is also highly regarded by the club for serving as sponsors during the 2001–02 and 2002–03 seasons, when the club had been relegated to the Regional League and faced financial difficulty.

Futsal 
Since June 1, 2015, Fortuna Düsseldorf has its futsal department. Since then, the Futsal department has developed into one of the strongest in Germany. They took part in the Deutsche Futsal Meisterschaft 2021 of the DFB as the winner of the Futsalliga West in the 2020–21 season and is one of the founding members of the Futsal Bundesliga. The team is wearing on the 3rd September 2021 in their home venue, the Castello in Düsseldorf, the opening match of the Bundesliga against the HSV Panthers.

References

External links

 

 
Football clubs in Germany
Football clubs in North Rhine-Westphalia
Sport in Düsseldorf
Association football clubs established in 1895
1895 establishments in Germany
Bundesliga clubs
2. Bundesliga clubs
3. Liga clubs